The Kermadec spiny dogfish (Squalus raoulensis) is a dogfish described in 2007. It is a member of the family Squalidae, found off the Kermadec Islands.

In June 2018 the New Zealand Department of Conservation classified the Kermadec spiny dogfish as "Data Deficient" under the New Zealand Threat Classification System.

References

Squalus
Fish described in 2007